The Golden Eagle Award for Best Documentary is one of twenty award categories presented annually by the National Academy of Motion Pictures Arts and Sciences of Russia. It is one of the Golden Eagle Awards, which were conceived by Nikita Mikhalkov as a counterweight to the Nika Award established in 1987 by the Russian Academy of Cinema Arts and Sciences.

Each year the members of the academy shortlist three films for the award. The first film to be awarded was Охота на ангела или Четыре любви поэта и прорицателя. The most recent award was given to Антон тут рядом, in 2012. Sergey Miroshnichenko holds the record for the most nominations and wins (six and two, respectively).

Nominees and winners
Key

References

External links
 

Documentation
Lists of films by award
Documentary film awards